Lanka Prajathanthravadi Pakshaya ('Ceylon Democratic Party') was a political party in Sri Lanka. LPP was led by Dr. Wijeyananda Dahanayake. In the 1960 elections LPP was part of the 'Mahajana Eksath Peramuna' coalition, consisting of the Sri Lanka Freedom Party, Viplavakari Lanka Sama Samaja Party, Jathika Vimukthi Peramuna and LPP.

Ahead of the 1965 elections the link between LPP and SLFP had been broken. LPP won one seat. After the elections LPP gave their support to the United National Party government. Soon thereafter it merged into the Sri Lanka Freedom Socialist Party, which merged into UNP.

Electoral history

Defunct political parties in Sri Lanka
Political parties in Sri Lanka